Milton Brown (February 28, 1804 – May 15, 1883) was a U.S. Representative from Tennessee.

Biography
Brown was born in Lebanon, Ohio. After growing up, he moved to Nashville, Tennessee. He married Sarah F. Jackson on January 21, 1835, and they had seven children, four boys and three girls.

Career
Brown studied law and was admitted to the Tennessee bar and began his practice in Paris, Tennessee, but later, he moved south to Jackson, Tennessee.

In 1835 Brown became a judge of the chancery court of west Tennessee and held this position until he was elected as a Whig to the Twenty-seventh Congress, representing the twelfth district. He served in that Capacity from March 4, 1841 to March 3, 1843. Reelected to the two succeeding Congresses representing the eleventh district, he served from March 4, 1843 to March 4, 1847.

Brown was one of the founders of two Universities: Southwestern University, which became Union University), and of Lambuth College, both in Jackson, Tennessee. He also served as president of the Mississippi Central & Tennessee Railroad Co. from 1854 to 1856, and as president of the Mobile & Ohio Railroad Co. from 1856 to 1871.

Death
Brown died in Jackson, Tennessee on May 15, 1883 (age 79 years, 76 days). He is interred in Riverside Cemetery in Jackson.

References

External links

1804 births
1883 deaths
People from Jackson, Tennessee
People from Lebanon, Ohio
Businesspeople from Ohio
Tennessee state court judges
Union University
Lambuth University people
Whig Party members of the United States House of Representatives from Tennessee
19th-century American politicians
19th-century American businesspeople
19th-century American judges